A. B. DeComathiere (19 November 1877 - 18 May 1940) was an actor in the United States. He had a leading role in The Brute (1920). He also starred in the race film The Black King (1932), a satire of Marcus Garvey and his followers.

He was born in New York. He was Connie in the Vaudeville team Sloe and Connie.

Filmography
The Brute (1920) as "Bull" Magee
The Hypocrite (1922)
Deceit (1923 film) (1923) as Reverend Bently
The Midnight Ace (1928)
The Exile (1931)
The Black King (1932) Ten Minutes to Live (1932) as Anthony

TheaterAn African Prince (1920)Dumb Luck (1922)Goat Alley (1927)Porgy (play) as Simon Frazier, a lawyerThe Second Coming (1931)Ol' Man Satan (1932) as SatanRagtime'' (1933)

References

1877 births
1940 deaths
American actors